Turn the Tides is the only studio album by 38th Parallel.

Critical reception
Ashleigh Kittle writes in her AllMusic review, "38th Parallel offers listeners an edgy style, at times mixing elements of hip-hop with gentler melodies and harmonies."

J. D. of Jesus Freak Hideout writes, "While 38th is nothing new to our ears, they offer a decent debut with Turn the Tides and a positive release for those tired of the trite angst of secular counterparts."

Todd Hertz of Christianity Today ranks this album No. 11 in its Top 12 Christian Albums of 2002. The review says, "Turn the Tides is a terrific debut with tight hooks, head-bobbing rhythms, smooth vocals, and godly lyrics."

Track listing
 "Hear My Cry" - 2:58
 "Turn the Tides" - 2:49
 "Higher Ground" - 3:44
 "Clouded" - 2:55
 "Who Am I?" - 3:31
 "Horizon" - 3:53
 "State of Mind" - 3:53
 "You Are My God" - 3:49
 "Wither" - 3:39
 "3 Times Denied" - 3:00

References

External links
Track list on MusicBrainz

2002 albums
38th Parallel (band) albums